Lycée Français de Valence (LFV) is a French international school in Paterna, Spain, near Valencia. It serves petite section of maternelle/infantil (preschool) through terminale, the final year of lycée/bachillerato (senior high school/sixth form college).

See also
 
 Liceo Español Luis Buñuel, a Spanish international school near Paris, France

References

External links
  Lycée Français de Valence
  Lycée Français de Valence

French international schools in Spain
Schools in Paterna